Mubashir Husain Rehmani (Urdu: مبشر حسین رحمانی) (born on 23 February 1983 in Karachi, Pakistan) is a Pakistani researcher and computer scientist. His areas of work are computer networking, telecommunications, wireless communications and blockchain. He was recognised in 2020  and 2021 as one of the Highly Cited Researchers in computer science by Clarivate.

Education and career
He received his B.Engg. degree in Computer Systems Engineering from Mehran University of Engineering and Technology. M.S. degree in Networks and Telecommunications from University of Paris XI, Paris, France. PhD in Computer Science, from Sorbonne University, France. He worked as a Post Doctoral Researcher in Waterford Institute of Technology.

Dr Rehmani is currently teaching in Department of Computer Science at the Munster Technological University (MTU). He is a senior member of IEEE, an Editorial Board Member of Nature Scientific Reports. Prior to that he is editor of various journals. He was associated with COMSATS University Islamabad, Wah Cantt for 5 years as an Associate Professor. Mubashir serves as an Area Editor (Wireless Communications) in IEEE Communications Surveys and Tutorial (top ranked # 1 journal in Telecommunications by Clarivate).

Awards

 In 2021, Dr. Rehmani won the Exemplary Editor Award 2021 of IEEE Communications Surveys and Tutorials given by IEEE Communication society.
 In 2021, Rehmani won the Clarivate Highly Cited Researcher award, recognizing him as top 1% in the world in Crossfield.
 In 2020, Rehmani won the Clarivate Highly Cited Researcher award, recognizing him as top 1% in the world in Computer Science.
 The Editor-in-Chief of Elsevier Journal of Network and Computer Applications awarded him Best Survey Paper award in 2018 and a cash prize.
 In 2018 and 2017, Rehmani won Publons Peer Review Award, placing him in Top 1% of reviewers in Computer Science.
 In 2017, Rehmani received Outstanding Associate Editor by IEEE Access.
 In 2015/2016 -  Best Research Paper award was giving to him along with Ayaz Ahmad, Sadiq Ahmad, and Naveed Ul Hassan by Higher Education Commission (HEC), Government of Pakistan.
 In 2017, Best Paper Award was given to him by Communications Systems Integration and Modeling Technical Committee by IEEE.
 In 2016 & 2017, Research Productivity Award was given to him by Pakistan Council for Science and Technology (PCST), Ministry of Science and Technology, Pakistan.
 In 2015, Rehmani won the Exemplary Editor Award of IEEE Communications Surveys and Tutorials.

Editorial activities

Area editor 
IEEE Communications Surveys and Tutorial – 2018 to present

Editorial board member 
NATURE Scientific Reports

Associate editor 
IEEE Communications Surveys and Tutorial – 2015 to 2018

IEEE Transactions on Green Communications and Networking - 2021–Present

Elsevier Journal of Network and Computer Applications – 2015 to Present 

Springer Wireless Networks Journal – 2015–present

Elsevier Future Generation Computer Systems – 2017 to present

Associate technical editor 
IEEE Communications Magazine – 2014 to 2020

Teachers 
Rehmani's teachers included Mufti Muhammad Naeem Memon sahib of Hyderabad (who is the caliph of Mufti Muhammad Taqi Usmani and Maulana Muhammad Yusuf Ludhianvi shaheed.

Bibliography 
Mubashir Rehmani is the author of one textbook and several edited books:

Text book

Edited books

Islamic work 
Rehmani wrote several articles on Islamic related matters:

 One of his article on "Scientific Research, Modern Education, and Madaris"  "سائنسی تحقیق، عصری علوم اور دینی مدارس" is published in Bayyinat in Nov and Dec 2021- Jamia Uloom-ul-Islamia
 Another article "عصرِ حاضر کی سائنسی تحقیق اور متعلقہ اسلامی احکام" was published in Darul Uloom Deoband

References 

1983 births
Living people
Academics from Karachi
Pakistani computer scientists
Mehran University of Engineering & Technology alumni
Paris-Sud University alumni
Paris-Sorbonne University alumni

Alumni of Waterford Institute of Technology